Star Trek: Challenger is a spin-off series of Star Trek novels published by Pocket Books in the United States as part of Pocket's  line.  Based on the titular TV series created by Gene Roddenberry, the series was created by Pocket editor John J. Ordover and writer Diane Carey, and was a continuation of the six-book storyline, Star Trek: New Earth.  The sixth and final New Earth book was subtitled Challenger, and served as a springboard for Star Trek: Challenger.  It was published on August 1, 2000.

Premise
The New Earth novel Challenger features the survivors of a destroyed starship's crew constructing and launching a new starship in a far-off colony area that is vital for the continuance of the Federation.

Books

New Earth

Star Trek: New Earth: Wagon Train to the Stars by Diane Carey 
Star Trek: New Earth: Belle Terre by Dean Wesley Smith with Diane Carey 
Star Trek: New Earth: Rough Trails by L.A. Graf 
Star Trek: New Earth: The Flaming Arrow by Kathy Oltion and Jerry Oltion 
Star Trek: New Earth: Thin Air by Kristine Kathryn Rusch and Dean Wesley Smith 
Star Trek: New Earth: Challenger by Diane Carey

Challenger
Gateways #2: Chainmail by Diane Carey 
Gateways #7: What Lay Beyond (anthology) by Diane Carey, Peter David, Keith R.A. DeCandido, Christie Golden, Robert Greenberger, and Susan Wright

Main characters  
New Earth
Rear Admiral James T. Kirk 
Commander Spock
Doctor Leonard McCoy 
Commander Montgomery Scott 
Lieutenant Commander Hikaru Sulu 
Lieutenant Pavel Chekov 
Lieutenant Commander Uhura 

Challenger
Commander Nick Keller

Authors 
Diane Carey 
L.A. Graf 
Dean Wesley Smith 
Kathy Oltion 
Jerry Oltion 
Kristine Kathryn Rusch

Challenger

original series Star Trek